Keegan Swirbul (born September 2, 1995) is an American cyclist, who currently rides for Vigo-Rías Baixas, a Spanish cycling club based in Vigo, Pontevedra.

He formerly rode for UCI ProTeam .
He is the older brother of cross-country skier Hailey Swirbul.

Career
With this team, he finished 7th overall in the 2018 Tour of Utah.

Major results

2014
 2nd Road race, National Under-23 Road Championships
 3rd Mount Evans Hill Climb
2015
 1st  Road race, National Under-23 Road Championships
2017
 2nd Mount Evans Hill Climb
 7th Overall Tour de Beauce
2018
 2nd Mount Evans Hill Climb
 7th Overall Tour of Utah
 8th Overall Tour de Beauce
2019
 1st Mount Evans Hill Climb
 2nd Overall Tour de Langkawi
 4th Overall Tour de Beauce
 6th Overall Tour of the Gila

References

External links

1995 births
Living people
American male cyclists
People from Eagle County, Colorado
People from Pitkin County, Colorado
American people of Latvian descent